Hessenheim is a commune in the Bas-Rhin department in Alsace in north-eastern France.

Geography
Hessenheim lies just over twelve kilometres (eight miles) to the southeast of Sélestat. To the south is the commune of Heidolsheim; Marckolsheim is across the canal to the east. On the eastern side, the commune's territory is bordered by the Rhône-Rhine Canal, which here runs parallel with but approximately four kilometres to the west of the river Rhine itself and the German frontier.

The economy is based on agriculture: an important ingredient in that is livestock rearing.  To the north of the village is the so-called Hessenheimer Pasture land, though most of this is within the adjacent commune of Mussig.

See also
 Communes of the Bas-Rhin department

References

Communes of Bas-Rhin
Bas-Rhin communes articles needing translation from French Wikipedia